Pierre Eugène Onfroy de Bréville (21 February 1861 – 24 September 1949) was a French composer.

Biography
Pierre de Bréville was born in Bar-le-Duc, Meuse. Following the wishes of his parents, he studied law with the goal of becoming a diplomat. However, he abandoned his plans after a few years and entered the Conservatoire de Paris. He began his musical studies with Théodore Dubois (1880–1882), later taking courses under the direction of César Franck.

He became a professor, teaching counterpoint at the Schola Cantorum in Paris (1898–1902). Following a twelve-year break, he taught classes in chamber music composition at the Conservatoire de Paris (1914–1918).

He established himself as a music critic and became well known for his reviews and commentary in Mercure de France, Le Courrier musical and La Revue blanche.  He died in Paris.

Although de Bréville was not prolific, he lavished attention to his own compositions, producing several highly original works remembered for their quality. He also completed the orchestration of César Franck's unfinished opera Ghiselle with Vincent d'Indy and Ernest Chausson.

Selected compositions
Stage
 L'anneau de Çakuntala (The Ring of Shakuntala), Incidental Music for the play Abhijñānaśākuntalam by Kālidāsa
 Le Pays des fées, Incidental Music
 La Princesse Maleine, Opera
 Les Sept Princesses (The Seven Princesses), Incidental Music
 Éros vainqueur (Eros, Conqueror), Lyric Opera in 3 acts, 4 scenes (1905); libretto by Jean Lorrain; first performance 7 March 1910, Théâtre de la Monnaie, Brussels (with Claire Croiza in the title role)
 Les Egyptiens, Ballet, an overture to a piece by Maurice Maeterlinck

Orchestral works
 La Nuit de décembre
 Stamboul, Orchestral Suite

Concertante
 Tête de Kenwark, Scène lyrique for cello and orchestra after a dramatic poem by Leconte de Lisle

Chamber music
 Sonata No.1 in C minor for violin and piano (1918–1919)
 Une flûte dans les vergers for flute and piano (1920)
 Pièce for oboe (or flute, or violin) and piano (1923)
 Poème dramatique for cello and piano (1924)
 Prière (D'après le Cantique de Molière) for cello and organ (or piano) (1924)
 Sonatina for oboe (or flute, or violin) and piano (1925)
 Sonata No.2 "Sonate fantaisie en forme de rondeau" for violin and piano (1927)
 Sonata in D minor for cello and piano (1930)
 Fantaisie appassionata for cello and piano (1934)
 Sonata for violin and piano (1942)
 Sonata for violin and piano (1943)
 Sonata for viola and piano (1944)
 Concert à trois for violin, cello, and piano (1945)
 Sonata for violin and piano (1947)
 Fantaisie for guitar
 Trio à cordes
 Trio d'anches

Organ
 Suite brève for organ (or harmonium) (1896)
 Prélude, méditation et prière for organ without pedals (1912)
 Deuxième suite brève en cinq parties for organ (or harmonium) (1922)

Piano
 Fantaisie: Introduction, fugue et finale (c.1900)
 Portraits de maîtres (Portraits of Masters) (1907)
     Gabriel Fauré
     Vincent d'Indy
     Ernest Chausson
     César Franck
 Impromptu et choral (1912)
 Stamboul: rhythmes et chansons d'Orient, 4 Pieces (1921)
 Prélude et fugue (1923)
 Sonate en ré bémol (Sonata in D) (1923)
 Sept esquisses (7 Sketches) (1926)
 Quatre sonates (1939)
 Fantasia appassionata

Vocal
 La forêt charmée for voice and piano (1891); words by Jean Moréas
 Epitaphe for voice and piano (1899); words taken from the tombstone of Marie Dupuis in the "Église de Senan"
 Le Furet du bois joli for voice and piano (1899); words by Jean Bénédict
 Poèmes de Jean Lorrain mis en musique (Poems of Jean Lorrain Set to Music) (1899?)
     La mort des lys
     La belle au bois
     La petite Ilse
 Quatre mélodies pour voix moyennes (Four Songs for Medium Voice) with piano accompaniment (1912)
     Une jeune fille parle; words by Jean Moréas
     Venise marine; words by Henri de Régnier
     Berceuse; words by Henri de Régnier
     Sous les arches de roses; words by Charles van Lerberghe
 Héros, je vous salue for voice and piano (1916); words by Henri de Régnier
 France for voice and piano (1917); words by Henri de Régnier
 Sainte for voice and piano (1922); words by Stéphane Mallarmé
 Bonjour mon cœur for voice and piano (1925); words by Pierre de Ronsard
 La Terre les eaux va buvant for voice and piano (1925); words by Pierre de Ronsard
 Ô mon ange gardien for voice and piano (1925); words by Francis Jammes
 Baiser for voice and piano (1926); words by Émile Cottinet
 Cantique de 1ère communion for soprano, violin and organ (or piano) (1926); words by Henry Gauthier-Villars
 La Cloche fêlée for voice and piano (1926); words by Charles Baudelaire
 12 Rondels de Charles d'Orléans for voice and piano (1930); words by Charles d'Orléans
 Bernadette
 La Petite Ilse
 Cœur ardent
 L'Heure mystique

Choral
 Hymne à Venus, Vocal duo or chorus in 2 parts in phrygian mode (c.1885); words by Auguste Villiers de l'Isle-Adam
 Messe (Mass) for soprano, tenor, baritone, mixed chorus (STB), string quartet, harp and organ (1890s)
 Sainte Rose de Lima, Scène mystique for soprano, female chorus and orchestra (1890s); words by Félix Naquet
 Tantum ergo sacramentum veneremur cernui, Hymne au Saint Sacrement for mezzo-soprano, female chorus and organ (c.1900)
 Les Cèdres du Liban (Cedars of Lebanon) for mixed chorus a cappella
 Motets pour la messe des morts
 Salut for soloists, female chorus and organ or harmonium

Writings
 Les Fioretti du père Franck, (1935–1938), a biography of César Franck
 Une histoire du théâtre lyrique en France

References

External links 
 

1861 births
1949 deaths
People from Bar-le-Duc
20th-century classical composers
French male classical composers
French ballet composers
French opera composers
Male opera composers
Academic staff of the Schola Cantorum de Paris
Conservatoire de Paris alumni
Academic staff of the Conservatoire de Paris
French music critics
French male non-fiction writers
Members of the Ligue de la patrie française
20th-century French composers
20th-century French male musicians